YKA may refer to:

Kamloops Airport
Yves Ker Ambrun, French artist
.yka, extension of Yenka files
Yuri Kuma Arashi, a Japanese manga and anime series
Young Kikuyu Association, Kenyan political movement